Grand Gaube is a town located in the Rivière du Rempart District, northern Mauritius. It lies on the coast of the Indian Ocean. In the 60's and 70's its population consisted exclusively of Mauritian Creoles and Indo-Mauritians, with the exception of a handful of Franco-Mauritians and three Chinese families. The town has two harbors, one is by the St Michel R C A School and the other is in Melville, another ward of the town. 

Populated places in Mauritius
Beaches of Mauritius